Ardozyga elassopis is a species of moth in the family Gelechiidae. It was described by Turner in 1919. It is found in Australia, where it has been recorded from Queensland.

The forewings are whitish irrorated with grey, more closely so beneath the costa and towards the termen. The stigmata are blackish, minute, the plical beyond the first discal. The hindwings are pale-grey.

References

Ardozyga
Moths described in 1919
Moths of Australia